Ronald Gene Rightnowar (born September 5, 1964, in Toledo, Ohio) is a former major league baseball player who played for one year—1995—for the Milwaukee Brewers.

Rightnowar is known for having been a replacement player who crossed picket lines during spring training in 1995 while the 1994 Major League Baseball strike was still going on.

Early life and education 
Rightnowar graduated from Whitmer High School in Toledo.  He also attended and played baseball at Eastern Michigan University.

Minor-league career 
After college, Rightnowar was signed by the Detroit Tigers as an amateur free agent on September 30, 1986. In 1987, Rightnowar began his minor-league career by spending the entire season pitching for the Fayetteville Generals in the Class A South Atlantic League. Rightnowar went 7-7 for Fayetteville (which was in its first season of existence), making 39 appearances, striking out 65, walking 37, saving 6 games and posting a 4.96 earned run average.

In 1988, Rightnowar was promoted to the Lakeland Flying Tigers in the High-A Florida State League, where he went 2–0 in 17 games with 32 strikeouts and just 11 walks in 49⅓ innings pitched. Rightnowar also posted a 1.46 ERA.

In 1989, Rightnowar advanced to AA ball, pitching for the London Tigers and going 2–8 with a 5.00 ERA in 36 appearances. Rightnowar saved five games that season.

The following year, Rightnowar divided his time between three Detroit Tigers minor-league teams: London (2-2, 3.25 ERA, 33 strikeouts, 9 walks, 4 saves, 44⅓ innings pitched and 23 games), the Class-A Niagara Falls Rapids (1-0, 0.00 ERA, 9 strikeouts, 1 walk, 7 innings pitched in just one appearance), and the AAA Toledo Mud Hens (4-5, 4.74 ERA, 28 strikeouts, 10 walks, 6 saves, 38 innings pitched in 28 games).

In 1991, Rightnowar divided his time between London (2-1, 3.91 ERA, 18 strikeouts, 8 walks, 3 saves, 25⅓ innings pitched in 15 appearances) and Toledo (1-1, 3.94 ERA, 5 strikeouts, 15 walks, 3 saves, 29⅔ innings pitched in 23 games).

The following year, Rightnowar played solely for his hometown Mud Hens and continued his role as a middle reliever, posting a 3–2 record but a high 6.16 ERA. He pitched 57 innings in 34 games, picking up three saves, striking out 33 and walking 18.

In 1993, Rightnowar began the season with Toledo again, going 2–2 with a 3.55 ERA in 58-1/3 innings pitched.  Appearing in 22 games, Rightnowar struck out 32, walked 19 and saved one game. On August 28, 1993, the Detroit Tigers traded Rightnowar to the Milwaukee Brewers for a player to be named later. With the trade, Rightnowar joined the Brewers' AAA New Orleans Zephyrs minor-league club for the remaining week of the minor-league season, pitching in four games and posting an 0–0 record with a 10.38 ERA.  Rightnowar also struck out eight and walked two in 8-2/3 innings pitched.

In 1994, Rightnowar's pitching improved dramatically, as he played a full season for the Zephyrs. He went 8–2 with a 2.25 ERA in 51 games, pitching 88 innings, striking out 79, walking just 21 and saving 11 games. Unfortunately, Rightnowar did not receive a September call-up, because major-league baseball players went on strike on August 12, 1994.

Replacement baseball 

As the 1995 baseball season neared, Rightnowar was asked by the Brewers' coaches if he would be interested in being a replacement player in the 1995 season. "The major-league coaching staff made it clear that I needed to pitch," Rightnowar told the Ottawa Citizen later in 1995. "They said they needed to see me and see what I could offer the club."

The 234-day players strike ended before the 1995 baseball season ever officially began.  While Rightnowar did pitch in some spring-training games (which was enough for the major-league baseball players union to classify Rightnowar and all such players as strike-breakers), he was sent down to the Brewers' AAA New Orleans minor-league team once the strike ended, and started the 1995 season pitching for New Orleans.

Major-league debut and career 

After Cal Eldred went on the disabled list for the rest of the season, the Brewers promoted Rightnowar to the major leagues on May 19, 1995. He was to be the first replacement player to join the Brewers' big-league club that season. Before he even threw a pitch, Rightnowar was given a frosty reception from the major-leaguers. "My first day, everyone was kind of cold toward me," Rightnowar told the Ottawa Citizen in 1995. "I understood. I respect their right to be angry. But then I called the leaders on the club and asked to speak to the team. I wanted to tell them my side of the story."

Rightnowar allowed that there was some bitterness for him in what should have been a happy moment. "It really stunk, to be honest with you," Rightnowar told the Toledo Blade in 2005. "From the time I was 8 or 9 years old, I had dreamed of what the day would be like if, and when, I ever made it to the big leagues. I figured it would be a real special day in my life, just like the day I got married. But I felt awful. They were all giving me the cold shoulder."

Ultimately, Rightnowar explained his reasons for crossing the picket lines.  "For about 20 minutes, they fired questions and took shots at me," he told the Blade. "I told them they could call me 'scab' or whatever. But I told them I hoped they respected my decision.  This was my one shot and I knew it."

On May 20, 1995, Rightnowar made his major league debut, working 2⅓ innings of scoreless relief against the Texas Rangers. On May 22, 1995, Rightnowar won his first big-league game against the Cleveland Indians, pitching two innings of relief and giving up one earned run. "That first major-league victory - man, what a great feeling!" Rightnowar told reporters after the game. "This is really special."

Rightnowar stayed with the Brewers until August 5, 1995, when he was sent down to the AAA New Orleans Zephyrs. He finished his season with New Orleans with a 1–1 record and a 2.67 ERA. Rightnowar also struck out 22, walked 9, saved 10 games, and pitched in 30⅓ innings in 25 games.

Rightnowar rejoined the Brewers on September 6, 1995, returning to the team's 40-man roster once New Orleans' season ended and major-league teams were able to expand their rosters. Rightnowar ended his Brewers season—and, ultimately, his major-league career—with a 2–1 record, a 5.40 ERA, 22 strikeouts, 18 walks, and one save in 36-2/3 innings pitched in 34 games.  His one MLB save came on June 7, 1995. Rightnowar went 1 scoreless inning to close out a 6-3 Brewers win over the Twins.

Retirement 

On October 16, 1995, Rightnowar was granted free agency. No major-league teams showed an interest in Rightnowar after the 1995 season, so he retired.

After major-league baseball 

In 1997, Rightnowar was hired as admissions director at Toledo Christian Schools. He also has co-owned a sports training center and coached a nine-team travel baseball league.  He is currently a mortgage originator at Genoa Bank in Genoa, Ohio.

References

External links

Retrosheet
Venezuelan Professional Baseball League statistics

1964 births
American expatriate baseball players in Canada
Baseball players from Ohio
Caribes de Oriente players
American expatriate baseball players in Venezuela
Eastern Michigan Eagles baseball players
Fayetteville Generals players
Lakeland Flying Tigers players
Living people
London Tigers players
Major League Baseball pitchers
Milwaukee Brewers players
New Orleans Zephyrs players
Niagara Falls Rapids players
Sportspeople from Toledo, Ohio
Toledo Mud Hens players